The Pineapple Museum is a museum dedicated to Pineapple plantation and processing industry which is located in Pekan Nanas, Pontian District, Johor, Malaysia. It was inaugurated by Johor Chief Minister Abdul Ghani Othman on 21 May 2002. Formerly under the Agricultural Department, the management of the museum was transferred to the Malaysian Pineapple Industry Board in March 2021. The museum exhibits collections, history and information on pineapple plantation industry, as well as products and tools for pineapple processing.

See also
 List of museums in Malaysia
 Agriculture in Malaysia

References

External links
 

2002 establishments in Malaysia
Museums established in 2002
Museums in Johor
Pineapple production
Pontian District